This is a list of Belgian football transfers for the 2016 summer transfer window. Only transfers involving a team from the professional divisions are listed, including the 16 teams in the Belgian First Division A and the 8 teams playing in the Belgian First Division B.

The summer transfer window will open on 1 July 2016, although some transfers were announced prior to that date. Players without a club may join one at any time, either during or in between transfer windows. The transfer window ends on 1 September 2016, although a few completed transfers could still be announced a few days later.

Sorted by date

January 2016

February 2016

March 2016

April 2016

May 2016

End of 2015–16 season
After the end of the 2015–16 season, several players will return from loan to another club or will not have their contracts extended. These will be listed here when the date is otherwise not specified.

June 2016

July 2016

August 2016

September 2016

Sorted by team

Belgian First Division A teams

Anderlecht

In:

Out:

Charleroi

In:

Out:

Club Brugge

In:

Out:

Eupen

In:

Out:

Genk

In:

Out:

Gent

In:

Out:

Kortrijk

In:

Out:

Lokeren

In:

Out:

Mechelen

In:

Out:

Mouscron

In:

Out:

Oostende

In:

Out:

Sint-Truiden

In:

Out:

Standard Liège

In:

 

Out:

Waasland-Beveren

In:

Out:

Westerlo

In:

Out:

Zulte Waregem

In:

Out:

Belgian First Division B teams

Antwerp

In:

Out:

Cercle Brugge

In:

 

Out:

OH Leuven

In:

Out:

Lierse

In:

Out:

Lommel United

In:

Out:

Roeselare

In:

 

Out:

Tubize

In:

Out:

Union SG

In:

Out:

Notes

References

Belgian
Transfers Summer
2016 Summer